The men's épée was a fencing event held as part of the fencing at the 1920 Summer Olympics programme. It was the fifth appearance of the event. A total of 80 fencers from 13 nations competed in the event, which was held from August 20 to 23, 1920. Each nation was limited to eight fencers, down from 12 in 1908 and 1912. Of the six fencing events, the only one in which Nedo Nadi did not win a gold medal was the one in which he did not compete. Instead, a trio of Frenchmen (Armand Massard, Alexandre Lippmann, and Gustave Buchard) swept the medals. It was Lippmann's second silver medal in the event, he having previously taken second in 1908; he was the second man to win multiple medals in the individual épée.

Background

This was the fifth appearance of the event, which was not held at the first Games in 1896 (with only foil and sabre events held) but has been held at every Summer Olympics since 1900.

Four of the eight finalists from the 1912 Games returned: silver medalist Ivan Joseph Martin Osiier of Denmark (who competed in seven Games from 1908 to 1948), fourth-place finisher Victor Boin of Belgium, seventh-place finisher Léon Tom of Belgium, and eighth-place finisher Martin Holt of Great Britain. The French and Italian teams, both of whom boycotted the 1912 Games over separate rules disputes, returned, including 1908 silver medalist Alexandre Lippmann.

Czechoslovakia and Egypt each made their debut in the event. Belgium, Great Britain, and the United States each appeared for the fourth time, tied for most among nations.

Competition format

The competition was held over four rounds. In each round, each pool held a round-robin, with bouts to 1 touch. Double-touches counted as touches against both fencers. Rather than hold separate barrages to separate fencers tied in the advancement spot (as had been done in 1908), the head-to-head results of bouts already fenced were used (as in 1912). The size of the pools was increased; where previously the maximum size of a pool was 8, now the final and semifinals consisted of 12 fencers each with the quarterfinals and first round pools also larger.

 First round: 9 pools of between 8 and 10 fencers each. The 5 fencers in each pool with the fewest touches against advanced to the quarterfinals.
 Second round: 4 pools of 11 or 12 fencers each. The 6 fencers in each pool with the fewest touches against advanced to the semifinals. 
 Semifinals: 2 pools of 12 fencers each. The 6 fencers in each pool with the fewest touches against advanced to the final.
 Final: 1 pool of 12 fencers.

Schedule

Results

First round

Pool A

Pool B

Pool C

Olivier advanced to the final after Otto Baerentzen (5th in Pool I) withdrew.

Pool D

Pool E

Pool F

Pool G

Pool H

Pool I

Quarterfinals

Quarterfinal A

Quarterfinal B

Quarterfinal C

Quarterfinal D

Semifinals

Semifinal A

Semifinal B

Final

Results summary

References

 
 

Fencing at the 1920 Summer Olympics